Epidemics is a peer-reviewed academic journal of epidemics. It is published by Elsevier. Its founding editors include Neil Ferguson.

References 

Open access journals
Epidemiology journals